Mahmudabad-e Olya (also Romanized as Maḩmūdābād-e ‘Olyā; also known as Maḩmūdābād, Maḩmūdābād-e Khafrak, and Mahmud Abad Khafrak) is a village in Rahmat Rural District, Seyyedan District, Marvdasht County, Fars Province, Iran. At the 2006 census, its population was 326, in 83 families.

References 

Populated places in Marvdasht County